Chino (Italian: Valdez, il mezzosangue, UK theatrical title: Valdez the Half Breed) is a 1973 Western film starring Charles Bronson, Jill Ireland, Marcel Bozzuffi, and Vincent Van Patten. The original English language title shown at the beginning of the film was The Valdez Horses, the same title that the 1967 novel by Lee Hoffman on which the movie is based. Hoffman was awarded the 1967 Western Writers of America Spur Award.

It was an Italian-Spanish-French co-production filmed in Spain, with Italian and French funding.

Plot
Chino Valdez (Bronson) is a lonely horse breeder, whose life is thrown into turmoil when a young runaway (Van Patten) turns up at his door looking for work and, later, he falls in love with a beautiful woman (Ireland) whose brother (Bozzuffi) hates him.

Cast

Production
Director John Sturges was unhappy with the finished film and considered the casting of Jill Ireland a fatal mistake. Six months after finishing the movie, Producer Dino De Laurentiis gathered the actors and crew to return for re-shoots and inserts. With Sturges no longer available, veteran Italian director Duilio Coletti was hired to complete the work. His name is listed as director on some European prints as a result.

Reception

Critical response
Time Out magazine said of the film, "Bronson suffers from galloping symbolism as Valdez, a wild horse-taming Mexican halfbreed representing different things to different people. Overall, he is the mustang, caught in a wild West which is being tamed and fenced in by white settlers... Despite a few dodgy moments when one really fears for Valdez' co-optability by Ireland's well-kept fragility, the film maintains its contradictory stance right through to a bitter-sweet ending. Valdez leaves, sans wife, sans house, but on his own terms, and after ensuring that if he can't tame the wild horses no one else will.

References

External links
 Chino at Peter Rodgers Organization
 
 
 
 Chino informational site
 Chino at the Spaghetti Western Database

1973 films
Films directed by John Sturges
Italian independent films
Spaghetti Western films
Films based on American novels
Films based on Western (genre) novels
French independent films
Spanish independent films
Films scored by Guido & Maurizio De Angelis
Films produced by Dino De Laurentiis
Films shot in Almería
English-language French films
English-language Italian films
English-language Spanish films
1970s English-language films
1970s Italian films
1970s French films